Johan Nordahl Brun (21 March 1745 – 26 July 1816) was the poet, dramatist, bishop of Bergen (1804–1816), and politician who contributed significantly to the growth of national romanticism in Norway, contributing to the growing national consciousness.

Early life and family
Johan Nordahl Brun was born in Byneset, just outside the city of Trondheim in Sør-Trøndelag county, Norway, on 21 March 1745.  He was born to the businessman Svend Busch Brun (1703–84) and his wife Mette Catharina Nordal. He traveled to Copenhagen in 1767, where he passed his theological examinations. While at the University of Copenhagen, Brun was a prominent member of The Norwegian Society, a group of younger Norwegian authors, poets and philosophers. He was married on 2 September 1773 to Ingeborg Lind.  Nordahl Grieg (Johan Nordahl Brun Grieg) was a descendant of the bishop and was named after him.

Career
After leaving the university, Brun worked for a time as a secretary to Bishop Johan Ernst Gunnerus in Trondheim. He was hired as the chaplain for the parish of Byneset Church in 1772. In 1774, he was called to be the parish priest for the Holy Cross Church in Bergen.  He served in this post from 1774 until 1793 when he was promoted to the position of Dean of Bergen and Nordhordland. In 1804, Brun was appointed bishop of the Diocese of Bjørgvin.  He served as bishop until his death on 26 July 1816.

Literary works
In literary history, Brun found his place when he wrote the first Norwegian romantic nationalistic play,  (1772). This play aroused a strong awakening of Norwegian spirit and was produced many times. He also wrote many poems, including Norway's first (unofficial) national anthem, "For Norge, Kiempers Fødeland" (1771),  and published a book of Lutheran Hymns (1786). He was also the writer of the city of Bergen's anthem "Jeg Tog Min Nystæmte" (1790).

References

External links
Johan Nordahl Brun Hymns
Johan Nordahl Brun 
Johan Nordahl Brun & The Church of the Cross

1745 births
1816 deaths
18th-century Norwegian clergy
Bishops of Bjørgvin
18th-century Norwegian writers
18th-century Norwegian poets